Kleine Ohe is a river of Bavaria, Germany. It is a headwater of the Ilz in Eberhardsreuth.

See also
List of rivers of Bavaria

References

Rivers of Bavaria
Rivers of Germany